Lawmaking is the process of crafting legislation.  In its purest sense, it is the basis of governance.  
This form of law making is also applied in India. It is a process which works in India on the basis of the Constitution of India.
Lawmaking in modern democracies is the work of legislatures, which exist at the local, regional, and national levels and make such laws as are appropriate to their level, and binding over those under their jurisdictions.  These bodies are influenced by lobbyists, pressure groups, sometimes partisan considerations, but ultimately by the voters who elected them and to which they are responsible, if the system is working as intended.  Even the expenditure of governmental funds is an aspect of lawmaking, as in most jurisdictions the budget is a matter of law.

In dictatorships and absolute monarchies the leader can make law essentially by the stroke of a pen, one of the main objections to such an arrangement.  However, a seemingly-analogous event can occur even in a democracy where the executive can make executive orders which have the force of law.  In some instance, even regulations issued by executive departments can have the force of law.  Libertarians, in particular, are known for denouncing such actions as being anti-democratic, but they have become such a salient feature of modern governance that it is hard to picture a system in which they no longer exist, because it is hard to picture the time involved in every regulation being debated prior to becoming law.  That, say libertarians, is precisely the point: if such executive orders and regulations do not stand up to legislative scrutiny, they should never be implemented.  In response to this, limits on regulatory authority have been made legislatively, and libertarians still contend for, if not the abolition of executive orders altogether, then their automatic sunset after a fixed period if not legislatively reviewed and confirmed; this policy has been adopted in some jurisdictions.

References

External links 

Legislative legal terminology
Indian legal terminology